Margo Lainne Greenwood is a Canadian senator and Indigenous scholar with expertise in early childhood care and education of Indigenous children. Greenwood is the Academic Leader of the National Collaborating Centre for Aboriginal Health, and a Professor in the First Nations Studies and Education programs at the University of Northern British Columbia. In 2021, Greenwood was appointed as an Officer of the Order of Canada for "her scholarship as a professor of early childhood education, and for her transformational leadership in Indigenous health policy."

Greenwood was born in Wetaskiwin, Alberta, Canada. She was orphaned at the age of 16. Greenwood completed a Bachelor's of Education (BEd) at the University of Alberta, a master's at the University of Victoria, and a PhD at the University of British Columbia in 2008. Previously, she has received the Queen's Golden Jubilee Award (2002) and a National Aboriginal Achievement Award (2011). She was appointed to the Senate of Canada on November 10, 2022.

References

External links 

1953 births
Living people
Canadian senators from British Columbia
Independent Canadian senators
People from Wetaskiwin
Indigenous studies in Canada
Officers of the Order of Canada
University of Victoria alumni
Canadian educational theorists
University of British Columbia alumni
University of Alberta alumni
Cree people
Indigenous Canadian senators